Alan Kenneth Adlington (January 30, 1925 – September 30, 2017) was a Canadian academic and economist who was acting president of the University of Western Ontario from 1984 to 1985. He also served in the capacity of vice-president administration, and later as the Ontario Deputy Minister of Colleges and Universities. He was formerly the chief financial officer and administrative officer at the University of Waterloo. Adlington was a veteran of World War II and an alumnus of the University of Western Ontario, where he earned a bachelor's degree in economics.

References

1925 births
2017 deaths
Canadian university and college chancellors